Aš is a town in Cheb District in the Karlovy Vary Region of the Czech Republic. It has about 12,000 inhabitants.

Administrative parts

Villages of Dolní Paseky, Doubrava, Horní Paseky, Kopaniny, Mokřiny, Nebesa, Nový Žďár and Vernéřov are administrative parts of Aš.

Geography
With the neighbouring municipalities Hranice, Krásná, Podhradí and Hazlov, it lies in the westernmost area of the Czech Republic known as the Aš Panhandle. This area is a salient surrounded by German territory in the east, north and west. It lies in the historical Egerland region.

Aš is situated in the Fichtel Mountains. The upper course of the White Elster river shortly after its source flows across the central part of the municipal territory, outside the town proper.

History

11th–18th centuries
Previously uninhabited hills and swamps, the town of Aš was founded in the early 11th century by German colonists descending from the Bavarian march of the Nordgau in the course of the Ostsiedlung. So far, previous Slavic settlements in the area are not known.

The first recorded rulers were the Vogt ministeriales from Weida, Thuringia, who gave the entire Vogtland region its name. In 1281, they officially received the estates as an immediate fief at the hands of King Rudolph I of Germany. Emperor Louis IV elevated them to Princes of the Holy Roman Empire in 1329. Nevertheless, two years later, they sold Aš land to King John of Bohemia, who since 1322 also held the adjacent Egerland in the south. Together with neighbouring Selb and Elster, Aš was enfeoffed to the Freiherren of Neuberg (Podhradí). When in 1394 Konrad von Neuburg died without a male heir, by virtue of Hedwig von Neuburg's marriage to Konrad von Zedtwitz, Aš passed into the control of the noble House of Zedtwitz.

In 1557, the Aš region was incorporated into the Lands of the Bohemian Crown by the Habsburg king Ferdinand I. Like the neighbouring Egerland, it remained Protestant until the Thirty Years' War, as the Counter Reformation did not stretch to the West Bohemian borderlands. In the 1648 Peace of Westphalia, the Protestant confession of the citizens was confirmed. In 1774, Empress Maria Theresa officially mediatised Aš as part of the Bohemian crown land within the Habsburg monarchy, against the delaying resistance by the Zedtwitz noble family. Nevertheless, she granted its Protestant citizens freedom of religion, confirmed in the 1781 Patent of Toleration, issued by her son Emperor Joseph II.

19th–20th centuries
From 1806, Aš with Bohemia belonged to the Austrian Empire and Cisleithanian Austria after the Compromise of 1867. Until 1918, the town remained part of Austria-Hungary, head of the Asch district, one of the 94 Bezirkshauptmannschaften in Bohemia. In 1854 a county legal code was granted to the region, ending five centuries of legal control by the Zedtwitz family. Aš was linked to the Eger (Cheb)–Hof railway line in 1864, with a branch-off to Saxon Adorf opened in 1885. It obtained the status of a town in 1872, as the population grew due to a flourishing textile industry. By 1910 the population had risen to 21,880, from 9,405 in 1869.

Upon the dissolution of the Austro-Hungarian monarchy at the end of the World War I, a soldiers' council seized power and rejected the demands of separatists from Eger for annexation to the Bavarian lands of the German Weimar Republic, preferring to remain with the Republic of German-Austria, which was however soon denied by the 1919 Paris Peace Conference. During the negotiations of the Treaty of Saint-Germain-en-Laye the Americans, like Allen Welsh Dulles, had failed to persuade other powers to make at least the Bohemian peninsulas within Germany, like Aš Land or Rumburk in the Šluknov Hook, legal parts of Weimar Germany. Thus the area became part of newly established state of Czechoslovakia, and received its current Czech name On 18 November 1920, Czech militia toppled the monument of Emperor Joseph II against local protest, whereby three citizens were shot. A 1921 Czechoslovak census counted 183 ethnic Czechs, in a population of 40,000 in the district, a 1930 census 520 Czechs, in a population of 45,000 in the district.
 

In 1937, the Sudeten German Party took over in Aš, led by Konrad Henlein, who for several years had worked in the town as a gym teacher. Henlein openly advocated the annexation of the Sudetenland territories to Nazi Germany, while Czech residents, mainly officials, were forced to leave the town. On 22 September 1938, a few days before the Munich Agreement, a Sudeten German Freikorps proclaimed a "Free State of Asch". Upon the German occupation of Czechoslovakia in October, according to the Agreement, Wehrmacht troops officially arrived, unopposed. By 1939 a German census counted a population of 23,130 in the town, almost 100% German Lutherans. From 1938 to 1945, Aš was administered as part of Reichsgau Sudetenland.

At the end of World War II, the town was occupied by U.S. Army forces on 20 April 1945. Czech officials arrested 64 men on 7 June and took them to Bory Prison in Plzeň, where half of them perished Due to the Expulsion of Germans from Czechoslovakia in 1946 by the Beneš decrees, the town's population was reduced to "half of the pre-war number of inhabitants". A German expellee website states that 30,327 Germans have been expelled from March to November in 27 trains. In 1949, 3,000 expellees met in far away Rüdesheim am Rhein, to protest, stating that their area never was inhabited by Slavs other than as a tiny minority.

The population shrank further in 1950 due to the establishment of the Iron Curtain and the Czechoslovak border fortifications during the Cold War by the ruling Communists, as the whole Aš district was included into the border zone which made many people move out. Because of the lowering number of inhabitants some houses remained uninhabited. There was lack of money for their renovation and it was necessary to demolish them.

Demographics
The present-day population in the town is roughly half of the pre-war population.

Transport

There are three road border crossings and one railway border crossing. Road border crossings lead to Bad Elster and Bad Brambach in Saxony in the east, as well as to Selb in Bavaria in the west. The railway border crossing leads to Selb.

The Cheb–Hranice v Čechách railway goes through the town. There are three train stations: Aš (the main train station), Aš-město and Aš-předměstí (currently just a shelter). This railway and the first station were built in 1865. In 1968, the old Royal Bavarian State Railways station building was demolished, and the current one was built in 1969. Aš station also lies on the Cheb–Oberkotzau railway. This railway was closed during the Cold War, but reopened in 2015.

Education
There are five kindergartens, four elementary schools, a gymnasium, a special school and a school of art located in Aš. A high school of textile also existed here.

Sights

The main square of the town is Goethovo Square named after J. W. Goethe, who often visited the town. In the middle of the square is the Memorial of J. W. Goethe from 1932, designed by Johannes Watzal. The landmark of the square is the town hall. It was built in 1733 in the Baroque style, but in 1814 was burned out. In 1816 it was built again, according to the original plans.

The Aš Museum was founded in 1892 and is subtitled "Ethnography and Textile Museum of Aš". It is housed in a building on the site of a former manor house, today called Zámeček ("Little Castle"). The most important textile collection is the collection of 22,000 pairs of gloves. Under the administration of the museum also operates "The stone crosses research society" which maintaints the central register of these monuments. The museum also includes gardens open to the public. Into the corner pillar of the garden is built the Salva Guardia stone relief with imperial symbols.

The town firehouse is a significant building from 1930 designed by Emil Rösler. In 2014, it was reconstructed. Today it houses part of the town museum. 

The Evangelical Church of the Good Shepherd is located on the site of a former church from 1480–1490. The original church was rebuilt in the Baroque style and only the tower was preserved.

The Church of Saint Nicholas is a Roman Catholic church built in 1867–1871 that replaced a late Baroque church from 1780.

The Memorial of Dr. Martin Luther was erected in 1883 and re-erected in 2008. It is the only Luther Monument in the country and in the whole of the former Austria-Hungary. It was located next to the evangelical church, which was one of the most important monuments of the region. The church burned down in 1960 and today is commemorated by perimeter wall and wooden cross.

On Háj, there is an eponymous observation tower. It was designed by Wilhelm Kreis and built in 1902–1903.

Gustav Geipel Memorial from 1924 is dedicated to this factory owner and patron of Aš, who sponsored children, poor and old people. Gustav Geipel's villa from 1888 is an architectural monument.

Trivia
Alongside with the municipality of Eš, Aš has the shortest place name in the Czech Republic with only two letters.

Notable people

Sebastian Knüpfer (1633–1676), German composer
Friedrich Wettengel (1750–1824), Lutheran theologian
Andreas Leonhardt (1800–1866), Austrian composer
Ernst Bareuther (1838–1905), Austrian politician
Karl Alberti (1856–1953), German historian
Emil Baumgärtel (1885–1939), Austrian politician
Otto Jäger (1894–1917), German flying ace
Wilhelm Ludwig (1901–1959), German geneticist
Karl Fritzsch (1903–1945), German KZ-commander
Hermann Fischer (1912–1984), German athlete and Communist resistance fighter against Nazism
Karl Komma (1913–2012), German composer
Rudolf Hilf (1923–2011), German historian and political scientist
Ernst Wilfer (1923–2014), German engineer
Oskar Fischer (1923–2020), German politician
Anton Bodem (1925–2007), German theologian
Gerhard Hahn (born 1933), German professor of medieval studies
Horst Tomayer (1938–2013), German writer and actor
Markéta Zinnerová (born 1942), children's book writer
Charly Höllering (1944–2009), German jazz musician
Wolf Stegemann (born 1944), German journalist, author and poet
Rüdiger Bartelmus (born 1944), German theologian and professor
Milan Bokša (born 1951), football manager
Petr Sepéši (1960–1985), singer
Jiří Plíšek (born 1972), football player and manager
Lukáš Rešetár (born 1984), futsal player
Lenka Marušková (born 1985), athlete
Jiří Sekáč (born 1992), ice hockey player

Twin towns – sister cities

Aš is twinned with:
 Fiumefreddo di Sicilia, Italy
 Marktbreit, Germany
 Oelsnitz, Germany
 Plauen, Germany
 Rehau, Germany

See also
NSTG Asch

References

External links

 
Populated places in Cheb District
Cities and towns in the Czech Republic